SVT Barn, formerly Barnkanalen and SVT B, is a Swedish free-to-air television channel from state broadcaster Sveriges Television dedicated to children's television programming.

History
SVT Barn, then known as Barnkanalen, started broadcasting on 23 December 2002. During its first year it was only available from 6.30 a.m. to 6.00 p.m. on weekdays. The channel also took a "summer vacation" between 23 May and 18 August. The rest of the time could be used for other programming; some weekends, one could see tennis in the schedule.

The programming was aimed at pre-school children in the mornings and the afternoon programming was targeted at older children (pre-teens). The morning block featured special announcers that presented programmes from "the TV ship". Right after it had finished, the morning programmes would rerun immediately. At 1.00 p.m., an interactive show called Twebby was broadcast, followed by programmes for older children presented by two animated continuity announcers called "Joppe and Nella". Afternoon programming included animation, English language programming as well as dramas from the SVT archives.

On 1 November 2003, the channel started broadcasting on weekends, from 7.00 a.m.. From 2004, SVT Barn would be a full year service.

During the 2004 Summer Olympics and the 2004 Summer Paralympics , SVT Extra would simulcast with SVT Barn in the evenings and from 27 September 2004, the evening slot would be occupied by Kunskapskanalen.

The TV ship was removed in the autumn of 2005 and its presenters was integrated with Bolibompa, the evening children strand on SVT1. Bolibompa would from then be the brand for pre-school programming on SVT Barn as well. Twebby was discontinued later in the autumn.

In February 2006, SVT Barn got new graphics and Joppe and Nella were removed. Instead, a new show called Bobster was shown between the programmes in the afternoon. Bobster would also broadcast between 7 p.m. and 7.30 p.m. in SVT1.

On 27 August 2007, SVT Barn started its broadcasting hours extended to 7 p.m., allowing Bobster to broadcast for another hour. On 25 August 2008 SVT made a major reshuffle in its schedules. This meant that the primetime broadcasts from Bolibompa at 6 p.m. and Bobster at 7 p.m. that were previously broadcast on SVT1 would be moved to SVT Barn. SVT Barn was upgraded as one of the three main channels from SVT, meaning that the channel would receive most of SVT's funding for children's programmes. With the reorganization, SVT Barn was given a new look. The new logo reads "SVTB", but it is still referred to as "Barnkanalen".

SVTB would now start every day at 6.30 a.m. with programmes aimed at pre-schoolers under the Bolibompa brand. This includes presenter-lead segments called Bolibompamorgon between 7 a.m. and 8.30 a.m. on Weekdays and Bolibompahelg between 8 a.m. and 10 p.m. on Weekends. Bolibompa continues until 3 p.m. when Bobster for the older children starts. On Weekends, Bobster starts at 2 p.m. Bobster also includes a news update from Lilla Aktuellt every weekday at 4 p.m. The primetime edition of Bolibompa broadcast between 6 p.m. and 7 p.m. This is followed by Bobster between 7 p.m. and 8 p.m.

Logos and identities

Programming

Pre-schoolers
Since the programming in the mornings is mostly aimed at preschoolers, it is either Swedish language in original, dubbed into Swedish or silent. In the past, they mostly aired older programming in the mornings such as Professor Balthazar, Doctor Snuggles and the Alfons Åberg films. Pingu was also aired on Barnkanalen. This was because it was expensive to dub foreign series and create new programs.

However, in the 2000s, 2010s, and 2020s, more recent imported series dubbed into Swedish, such as Bitz & Bob and Elinor Wonders Why and other popular PBS shows of 2020, as well as local productions, began to air. They continue to air, and new dubs continue being made, to this day.

Pre-teens and teens
In the 1990s and 2000s, Barnkanalen also showed some animation aimed at older children with their original soundtracks, for example the foreign anime Cardcaptors and imported American Animaniacs and AAAHH!!! Real Monsters. Notably, there is a version of Real Monsters dubbed into Swedish, but it was only shown on the competing satellite channel Nickelodeon Scandinavia at the time. Other animated programmes aired during this time included the animated Mr. Bean, Garfield and Friends, Code Lyoko, Martin Mystery, The Three Friends and Jerry, The Rubbish World of Dave Spud and Oggy and The Cockroaches.

In the later half of the 2000s to the 2010s, animated series aimed at older children acquired from countries around the world began to air with Swedish dubbing. They continue to air, and new dubs continue being made, to this day.

Other acquired programming includes drama series from several countries, such as Australia, the United States, the United Kingdom, the Netherlands, Canada, France and Germany.

The many Australian drama series shown in the channel included Mirror, Mirror, Search for Treasure Island, Home Farm Twins, The Saddle Club and Ocean Star. American shows include PBS series such as Ramona and Nickelodeon series The Secret World of Alex Mack. From the UK comes the Central series Woof! and Press Gang. Many live action shows that were once broadcast with their original soundtracks have been broadcast with Swedish dubbing in recent years.

Between 2011 and 2014, Barnkanalen was responsible for airing the Junior Eurovision Song Contest after previously having been aired on SVT 1.

Availability
Initially Barnkanalen was available on satellite from Canal Digital, on certain digital cable distributors, and free-to-air in the digital terrestrial network, being the first channel to broadcast without encryption in the platform. An agreement of distribution on the Viasat satellite platform was settled in 2003. A few days earlier, SVT had decided to allow cable providers to transform the channel and convert it to analogue PAL in their systems.

Many cable companies used copyright issues motivate an additional fee for the channel. An agreement that would make SVT pay the copyright costs was made some years later and made Barnkanalen (as well as Kunskapskanalen and SVT24) available in the analogue basic packages on the two major cable providers, UPC Sverige and Com Hem, from 1 July 2005. This increased the penetration of the channel dramatically.

References

External links
  

Sveriges Television
Television channels in Sweden
Television channels and stations established in 2002
2002 establishments in Sweden
Children's television networks